
Gmina Ustka is a rural gmina (administrative district) in Słupsk County, Pomeranian Voivodeship, in northern Poland. Its seat is the town of Ustka, although the town is not part of the territory of the gmina.

Villages
Gmina Ustka contains the following villages and settlements:
 Bałamątek
 Bałamątek
 Charnowo
 Dalimierz Przewłocki
 Dębina
 Dominek
 Duninówko
 Duninowo
 Duninowo-Kolonia
 Gąbino
 Gąbino-Kolonia
 Golęcino
 Grabno
 Krężołki
 Lędowo
 Lędowo-Osiedle
 Machowinko
 Machowino
 Mącznik
 Masłowo
 Modła
 Modlinek
 Możdżanowo
 Niestkowo
 Niestkowo-Kolonia
 Objazda
 Objazda-Kolonia
 Orzechowo
 Osieki Słupskie
 Owczary
 Pęplin
 Pęplinko
 Pęplino
 Pęplino-Kolonia
 Poddąbie
 Przewłoczki
 Przewłoka
 Redwanki
 Rówek
 Rowy
 Smużki
 Starkowo
 Starkowo-Kolonia
 Wodnica
 Wodnica-Kolonia
 Wytowno
 Wytowno-Kolonia
 Żabiniec
 Zabłocie
 Zalesin
 Zaleskie
 Zapadłe
 Zimowiska.

Neighbouring gminas
Gmina Ustka is bordered by the town of Ustka and by the gminas of Postomino, Słupsk and Smołdzino.

References
Polish official population figures 2006

Ustka
Słupsk County